Bella Coola Transit System provides transit services in the Bella Coola Valley of British Columbia. The system is served by community shuttle-type buses from Monday to Saturday.

Routes

Scheduled services

On-request service and flag-service at non-designated stops is provided.

References

Transit agencies in British Columbia